Liisa Laurila (born 1 March 1974) is a former synchronized swimmer from Finland.

References 

1974 births
Living people
Finnish synchronized swimmers
Olympic synchronized swimmers of Finland
Synchronized swimmers at the 1992 Summer Olympics
People from Kajaani
Sportspeople from Kainuu